This was the first edition of the tournament.

Grégoire Barrère won the title after defeating Tobias Kamke 6–1, 6–4 in the final.

Seeds

Draw

Finals

Top half

Bottom half

References
Main Draw
Qualifying Draw

Play In Challenger - Singles